Carl Joyce Gilbert (April 3, 1906 in Bloomfield, New Jersey – November 13, 1983 in Boston, Massachusetts) was the United States Trade Representative from 1969 to 1971. Gilbert had previously been president and chairman of the board of the Gillette Safety Razor Co. He had "joined Gillette as treasurer in 1948 and served as vice president and president before also becoming board chairman", and lead Gillette "from a domestic operation to one with worldwide branches -- making the name Gillette synonymous in many areas with razors". In 1961, he headed the Committee for a National Trade Policy, opposing import quotas and other barriers to the free exchange of goods, and "led efforts to liberalize reciprocal trade agreements".

After his nomination to the Trade Representative post by President Richard Nixon in 1969, the Senate, concerned by Gilbert's earlier stance on trade, deliberated for two months before confirming his appointment.

At the time of his death, Gilbert was president of the Association of Independent Colleges and Universities in Massachusetts.

References

1906 births
1983 deaths
Harvard Law School alumni
People from Dover, Massachusetts
United States Trade Representatives
Stanford University alumni